Exegesis (from the Greek , from , "to lead out") is a critical explanation or interpretation of a text. The term is traditionally applied to the interpretation of Biblical works. In modern usage, exegesis can involve critical interpretations of virtually any text, including not just religious texts but also philosophy, literature, or virtually any other genre of writing. The phrase Biblical exegesis can be used to distinguish studies of the Bible from other critical textual explanations.

Textual criticism investigates the history and origins of the text, but exegesis may include the study of the historical and cultural backgrounds of the author, text, and original audience. Other analyses include classification of the type of literary genres presented in the text and analysis of grammatical and syntactical features in the text itself.

Usage
One who practices exegesis is called an exegete (from the Greek ). The plural of exegesis is exegeses. Adjectives are exegetic or exegetical (e.g., exegetical commentaries). In biblical exegesis, the opposite of exegesis (to draw out) is eisegesis (to draw in), in the sense of an eisegetic commentator "importing" or "drawing in" their own subjective interpretations into the text, unsupported by the text itself. Eisegesis is often used as a derogatory term.

Mesopotamian commentaries
One of the early examples of exegesis, and one of the larger corpora of text commentaries from the ancient world, comes from Mesopotamia (modern day Iraq) in the first millennium BCE. Containing over 860 manuscripts, the majority of which date to 700–100 BCE, these commentaries explore numerous types of texts, including literary works (such as the Babylonian Epic of Creation), medical treatises, magical texts, ancient dictionaries, and law collections (the Code of Hammurabi). Most of them, however, comment on divination treatises, in particular treatises that predict the future from the appearance and movement of celestial bodies on the one hand (Enūma Anu Enlil), and from the appearance of a sacrificed sheep's liver on the other (Bārûtu).

As with the majority of the thousands of texts from the ancient Near East that have survived to the present day, Mesopotamian text commentaries are written on clay tablets in cuneiform script. Text commentaries are written in the East Semitic language of Akkadian, but due to the influence of lexical lists written in Sumerian language on cuneiform scholarship, they often contain Sumerian words or phrases as well.

Cuneiform commentaries are important because they provide information about Mesopotamian languages and culture that are not available elsewhere in the cuneiform record. To give but one example, the pronunciation of the cryptically written name of Gilgamesh, the hero of the Epic of Gilgamesh, was discovered in a cuneiform commentary on a medical text. However, the significance of cuneiform commentaries extends beyond the light they shed on specific details of Mesopotamian civilization. They shed light on what the concerns of the Mesopotamian literate elite were when they read some of the most widely studied texts in the Mesopotamian intellectual tradition, a perspective that is important for "seeing things their way." Finally, cuneiform commentaries are also the earliest examples of textual interpretation. It has been repeatedly argued that they influenced rabbinical exegesis.

The publication and interpretation of these texts began in the mid-19th century, with the discovery of the royal Assyrian libraries at Nineveh, from which ca. 454 text commentaries have been recovered. The study of cuneiform commentaries is, however, far from complete. It is the subject of on-going research by the small, international community of scholars who specialize in the field of Assyriology.

Commentaries on Plato

Commentaries on Plato refers to the great mass of literature produced, especially in the ancient and medieval world, to explain and clarify the works of Plato. Many Platonist philosophers in the centuries following Plato sought to clarify and summarise his thoughts, but it was during the Roman era, that the Neoplatonists, in particular, wrote many commentaries on individual dialogues of Plato, many of which survive to the present day.

Biblical commentaries

A common published form of biblical exegesis is known as a Bible commentary and typically takes the form of a set of books, each of which is devoted to the exposition of one or two books of the Bible. Long books or those that contain much material either for theological or historical-critical speculation, such as Genesis or Psalms, may be split over two or three volumes. Some, such as the Four Gospels, may be multiple- or single-volume, while short books such as the deuterocanonical portions of Daniel, Esther, and Jeremiah (i.e. Book of Susanna, Prayer of Azariah, Bel and the Dragon, Additions to Esther, Baruch and the Epistle of Jeremiah), or the pastoral or Johannine epistles are often condensed into one volume.

The form of each book may be identical or allow for variations in methodology among the many authors who collaborate to write a full commentary. Each book's commentary generally consists of a background and introductory section, followed by detailed commentary of the book pericope-by-pericope or verse-by-verse. Before the 20th century, a commentary would be written by a sole author, but in the recent period, a publishing board will commission a team of scholars to write a commentary, with each volume being divided out among them.

A single commentary will generally attempt to give a coherent and unified view on the Bible as a whole, for example, from a Catholic or Reformed (Calvinist) perspective, or a commentary that focuses on textual criticism or historical criticism from a secular point of view. However, each volume will inevitably lean toward the personal emphasis bias of its author, and within any commentaries there may be great variety in the depth, accuracy, and critical or theological strength of each volume.

Christianity

In Christianity, biblical exegesis have relied on various doctrines.

The doctrine of four senses of Scripture is a concept used in biblical hermeneutics. In the 3rd century, the theologian Origen, a graduate of Catechetical School of Alexandria, formulated the principle of the three senses of Scripture (literal, moral and spiritual) from the Jewish method interpretation (midrash) used by Paul of Tarsus in Epistle to the Galatians chapter 4.

The historical-grammatical method is a Christian hermeneutical method that strives to discover the Biblical author's original intended meaning in the text. It is the primary method of interpretation for many conservative Protestant exegetes who reject the historical-critical method to various degrees (from the complete rejection of historical criticism of some fundamentalist Protestants to the moderated acceptance of it in the Catholic Church since Pope Pius XII), in contrast to the overwhelming reliance on historical-critical interpretation, often to the exclusion of all other hermeneutics, in liberal Christianity.

Historical criticism also known as the historical-critical method or higher criticism, is a branch of literary criticism that investigates the origins of ancient texts in order to understand "the world behind the text".  This is done to discover the text's primitive or original meaning in its original historical context and its literal sense.

Revealed exegesis considers that the Holy Spirit inspired the authors of the scriptural texts, and so the words of those texts convey a divine revelation. In this view of exegesis, the principle of sensus plenior applies—that because of its divine authorship, the Bible has a "fuller meaning" than its human authors intended or could have foreseen.

Rational exegesis bases its operation on the idea that the authors have their own inspiration (in this sense, synonymous with artistic inspiration), so their works are completely and utterly a product of the social environment and human intelligence of their authors.

Catholic
 
Catholic centres of biblical exegesis include:
 the École Biblique of Jerusalem founded in 1890 by the Dominican order's Marie-Joseph Lagrange. The school became embroiled in the modernist crisis, and had to curtail its New Testament activities until after Vatican II
 the Pontifical Biblical Institute of Rome, a division of the Jesuit Gregorian University, has influenced Catholic exegesis through teaching and through the Pontifical Biblical Commission

Protestant
For more than a century, German universities such as Tübingen have had reputations as centers of exegesis; in the US, the Divinity Schools of Chicago, Harvard and Yale became famous.

Robert A. Traina's book Methodical Bible Study is an example of Protestant Christian exegesis.

Indian philosophy
Its notion of shabda "speech" as indivisible   unity of sound and meaning (signifier and signified) is due to Bhartrhari (7th century).

Islam

Tafsir ("interpretation") is the Arabic word for exegesis or commentary, usually of the Qur'an.

Tafsir does not include esoteric or mystical interpretations, which are covered by the related word . Shi'ite organization Ahlul Bayt Digital Islamic Library Project cites the Islamic prophet Muhammad as stating that the Qur'an has an inner meaning, and that this inner meaning conceals an even deeper inner meaning, in support of this view. Adherents of people for Sufism and Ilm al-Kalam pioneered this thought.

Judaism

Traditional Jewish forms of exegesis appear throughout rabbinic literature, which includes the Mishnah, the two Talmuds, and the midrash literature. Jewish exegetes have the title  ("commentators").

Midrash
The Midrash is a homiletic method of exegesis and a compilation of homiletic teachings or commentaries on the Tanakh (Hebrew Bible), a biblical exegesis of the Pentateuch and its paragraphs related to the Law or Torah, which also forms an object of analysis. It comprises the legal and ritual Halakha, the collective body of Jewish laws, and exegesis of the written Law; and the non-legalistic Aggadah, a compendium of Rabbinic homilies of the parts of the Pentateuch not connected with Law.

Biblical interpretation by the Tannaim and the Amoraim, which may be best designated as scholarly interpretations of the Midrash, was a product of natural growth and of great freedom in the treatment of the words of the Hebrew Bible.

Halakha and Aggadah
In the halakhic as well as in the haggadic exegesis, the expounder endeavored not so much to seek the original meaning of the text as to find authority in a Hebrew Bible passage for concepts and ideas, rules of conduct and teachings, for which he wished to have a foundation. The talmudical hermeneutics form  is defined as finding hints for a given law.

Midrashic
Midrash exegesis was largely in the nature of homiletics, expounding the Bible not in order to investigate its actual meaning and to understand the documents of the past but to find religious edification, moral instruction, and sustenance for the thoughts and feelings of the present. The contrast between explanation of the literal sense and the Midrash, that did not  follow the words, was recognized by the Tannaim and the Amoraim, although their idea of the literal meaning of a passage may not be allowed by more modern standards. The above-mentioned tanna, Ishmael b. Elisha said, rejecting an exposition of Eliezer b. Hyrcanus: "Truly, you say to Scripture, 'Be silent while I am expounding!'".

Tannaim
Tannaitic exegesis distinguishes principally between the actual deduction of a thesis from a passage as a means of proving a point, and the use of such a passage as a mere mnemonic device – a distinction that was also made in a different form later in the Babylonian schools. The Babylonian Amoraim were the first to use the expression "Peshaṭ" ("simple" or face value method) to designate the primary sense, contrasting it with the "Drash," the Midrashic exegesis. These two terms were later on destined to become important features in the history of Hebrew Bible exegesis. In Babylonia was formulated the important principle that the Midrashic exegesis could not annul the primary sense. This principle subsequently became the watchword of commonsense Bible exegesis.

How little it was known or recognized may be seen from the admission of Kahana, a Babylonian amora of the fourth century, that while at 18 years of age he had already learned the whole Mishnah, he had only heard of that principle a great many years later (Shab 63a). Kahana's admission is characteristic of the centuries following the final redaction of the Talmud. The primary meaning is no longer considered, but it becomes more and more the fashion to interpret the text according to the meaning given to it in traditional literature. The ability and even the desire for original investigation of the text succumbed to the overwhelming authority of the Midrash.

It was, therefore, providential that, just at the time when the Midrash was paramount, the close study of the text of the Hebrew Bible, at least in one direction, was pursued with rare energy and perseverance by the Masorites, who set themselves to preserving and transmitting the pronunciation and correct reading of the text. By introducing punctuation (vowel-points and accents) into the biblical text, in the seventh century, they supplied that protecting hedge which, according to Rabbi Akiva's saying, the Masorah was to be for the words of the Hebrew Bible. Punctuation, on the one hand, protected the tradition from being forgotten, and, on the other, was the precursor of an independent Bible science to be developed in a later age.

Mikra
The Mikra, the fundamental part of the national science, was the subject of the primary instruction. It was also divided into the three historic groups of the books of the Hebrew Bible: the Pentateuch, the Prophets, and the Hagiographa, called in traditional Hebrew attribution the Torah (the Law or Teaching), the Nevi'im (the Prophets) and the Kethuvim (the Writings) respectively. The intelligent reading and comprehension of the text, arrived at by a correct division of the sentences and words, formed the course of instruction in the Hebrew Bible. The scribes were also required to know the Targum, the Aramaic translation of the text. The Targum made possible an immediate comprehension of the text, but was continuously influenced by the exegesis taught in the schools.

The synagogues were preeminently the centers for instruction in the Hebrew Bible and its exegesis. The reading of the biblical text, which was combined with that of the Targum, served to widen the knowledge of the scholars learned in the first division of the national science. The scribes found the material for their discourses, which formed a part of the synagogue service, in the second division of the several branches of the tradition. The Haggadah, the third of these branches, was the source material for the sermon.

Jewish exegesis did not finish with the redaction of the Talmud, but continued during ancient times, the Middle Ages and the Renaissance; it remains a subject of study today. Jews have centers for exegetic studies around the world, in each community: they consider exegesis an important tool for the understanding of scripture. Associated with the rabbinic text studies, such methodology is known to adopt a wide assortment of literary tools, in conjunction with meticulous, widespread engagement with classical exegetical literature.

Zoroastrianism
Zoroastrian exegesis consists basically of the interpretation of the Avesta. However, the closest equivalent Iranian concept, zand, generally includes Pahlavi texts which were believed to derive from commentaries upon Avestan scripture, but whose extant form contains no Avestan passages. Zoroastrian exegesis differs from similar phenomena in many other religions in that it developed as part of a religious tradition which made little or no use of writing until well into the Sasanian era. This lengthy period of oral transmission has clearly helped to give the Middle Persian Zand its characteristic shape and has, in a sense, limited its scope. Although the later tradition makes a formal distinction between "Gathic" (gāhānīg), "legal" (dādīg), and perhaps "ritual" (hādag-mānsrīg) Avestan texts, there appear to be no significant differences in approach between the Pahlavi commentary on the Gathas and those on dādīg texts, such as the Vendīdād, the Hērbedestān and the Nērangestān.  Since many 19th and 20th century works by Zoroastrians contain an element of exegesis, while on the other hand no exegetical literature in the strict sense of the word can be said to exist, the phenomenon of modern Zoroastrian exegesis as such will be discussed here, without detailed reference to individual texts.

In a secular context
Secular exegesis is an element of the study of religion.

At Australian and British universities, the exegesis forms part of the required work for fine arts, including creative-writing, doctorates. A scholarly text accompanies a creative work, such as a film, novel, poetry or other artistic output by the PhD candidate. Together, the two elements form the candidate's research thesis.

See also

 Allegory in the Middle Ages
 Archetype
 Eisegesis
 Biblical criticism
 Form criticism
 Radical criticism
 Redaction criticism
 Source criticism
 Tradition criticism
 Biblical literalism
 Biblical software
 Biblical studies
 Close reading
 Gloss (annotation)
 Gymnobiblism
 Icon
 Literal and figurative language
 Narrative criticism
 Pesher
 Semiotics
 Symbol
 Typology (theology)

Footnotes

External links

 Biblical Interpretation and Application Reading Room: Extensive bibliography for biblical exegesis provided by Tyndale Seminary
 JewishEncyclopedia.com
 Cuneiform Commentaries Project

 
Religious terminology